Yoo Da-in (born Ma Young-seon on February 9, 1984) is a South Korean actress. She is best known for her performance in the indie film Re-encounter, her first leading role. In 2016, she played a supporting role in South Korean television series The Doctors.

Personal life 
In June 2021, Yoo's agency announced that Yoo was planning to marry director Min Yong-geun and hold a private event with only family and close friends. October 27, 2022, it was announced that she is pregnant with the couple's first child.

Filmography

Film

Television series

Music video

Awards and nominations

References

External links
 Yoo Da-in Fan Cafe at Daum 
 
 
 

South Korean film actresses
South Korean television actresses
1984 births
Living people